Van Buren was the codename given to what would have been Fallout 3, a role-playing video game that was being developed by Black Isle Studios before the parent company, Interplay Entertainment, went bankrupt. This resulted in the company shutting down Black Isle, which in turn laid off the PC development team on December 8, 2003, effectively cancelling the game.

Prior to its cancellation, Van Buren was set to carry on the Fallout series, but was not a sequel to Fallout 2. An official Fallout 3, unrelated to the abandoned  Van Buren project, was developed by Bethesda Game Studios after Interplay sold the single-player rights of the franchise to Bethesda Softworks. 

Several Black Isle staff members went on to form Obsidian Entertainment, and many themes, factions and characters of Van Buren were incorporated in Obsidian's Fallout: New Vegas, published by Bethesda Softworks in 2010.

Gameplay

Van Buren was planned to use a modified version of the SPECIAL system.

Plot and setting

Van Buren was set in the Western United States, taking place in Colorado, Arizona, Utah and Nevada. The game would have been set in 2253 and the player would start the game as an escaped prisoner; whether the character was wrongfully imprisoned or guilty was to be determined at character creation. 

The game would have started in a prison as it was attacked by an unnamed force. An explosion would knock the character unconscious, and the cell door would be open when he awakened. The player would then escape into the wasteland while being pursued by assailants. After leaving, the character would have the power to shape the destiny of the wasteland. Their interactions with organizations such as the Brotherhood of Steel and the burgeoning New Californian Republic (with both of these factions participating in a prolonged war with one another) could bolster or destroy the organizations, influencing people associated with them and eventually decide the fate of the region, much as in the previous two Fallout games.

One of the more significant elements of the plot and back story of Van Buren was to be an ongoing war between the Brotherhood of Steel and the New Californian Republic. The player would be able to visit various prominent settlements and fortresses controlled by either of the factions and their actions there would influence the proceeding of the war. An example of how the player's interactions could alter the flow of the conflict would be in the case of the settlement situated in the area around the Hoover Dam. Here the player could choose whether or not to aid the settlement and its people in a myriad of tasks, which would lead to this isolated frontier outpost eventually deciding the fate of the war. The game's ultimate plot line was planned so that the events in the beginning of the game would have been part of a scheme by a rogue New California Republic scientist, Dr. Victor Presper, to seize control of a U.S. orbital nuclear weapons platform dubbed B.O.M.B.-001 and use it to initiate a second nuclear holocaust, cleansing the world of all but his chosen few. In the end, the player would not be able to stop all of the missiles from launching, and their decisions on where the missiles would strike would ultimately have decided the future of the world. The player would be able to visit places such as Hoover Dam, Denver, Mesa Verde and the Grand Canyon.

Development 
Prior to the development of Van Buren, two attempts to make a new Fallout game were halted by Titus Software in favor for other of Interplay's titles, notably console titles. When Interplay lost the rights to make Icewind Dale and Baldur's Gate video games for the PC, their game Baldur's Gate III: The Black Hound, in development by Black Isle Studios, was canceled. With the cancellation of Baldur's Gate III, Black Isle Studio's team was immediately transferred to work on Fallout 3, codenamed Van Buren. During this time, Interplay's own team was working on Fallout: Brotherhood of Steel, the teams had one meeting together to plan out the games. When many of Black Isle Studio's most talented developers left Black Isle Studios, the developer Damien Foletto responded by stating it was only the trust within the team and belief that they could finish the game that kept them going. The game was officially canceled when Titus decided to try to improve Interplay's console division. This led to a nearly completed Fallout 3 being canceled. Members of the Black Isle team were then either transferred to the development of Fallout: Brotherhood of Steel 2 or Baldur's Gate: Dark Alliance II, of which only the latter was released.

Legacy

Response to cancellation

GameSpot named the cancellation of Van Buren a "heartbreaker", and the site's Steve Palley wrote that "Fallout fans were left feeling like they had gotten a 10 million Rad dose".

Later developments
Fallout 3 does not follow the storyline of the cancelled project, but during an interview, Avellone revealed that aspects from Van Buren would make an appearance in Fallout: New Vegas. In particular, the NCR–Brotherhood of Steel war is mentioned, a companion from Van Buren (Joshua Graham) appears in heavily modified form, as does an antagonistic faction known as Caesar's Legion. He said that the Van Buren codename was based on President Martin Van Buren. Of the locales planned to be in Van Buren, only Hoover Dam appeared in Fallout: New Vegas, due to the change in location.

On May 3, 2007, the tech demo of Van Buren was leaked onto the Internet. 

A trademark was filed for "Van Buren" on October 17, 2014, by Roxy Friday LLC, a company associated with inXile Entertainment.

References

External links 
Van Buren the Nukapedia Fallout wiki
 Van Buren Portal the Vault Fallout wiki
Interview with John Deiley  (June 2004)

Black Isle Studios games
Fallout (series) video games
Cancelled Windows games

it:Van Buren